Louis D. Guth (May 25, 1857 – March 15, 1939) was an American businessman and politician.

Biography
Born in the town of Polk, Washington County, Wisconsin, Guth went to Northwestern University and then graduated from the Milwaukee Spencerian Business College in 1870. Guth lived briefly in Minneapolis, Minnesota. In 1888, Guth settled in Kewaskum, Wisconsin and was in the insurance business. Guth served as chairman of the Kewaskum Town Board and was one of the incorporators of the village of Kewaskum, Wisconsin. He was assessor of incomes for Washington and Ozaukee Counties. In 1899, Guth served in the Wisconsin State Assembly and was a Republican. During his term he was sharply criticized in the press for introducing the unsuccessful "Guth bicycle bill," which would have forbidden bicycles on Wisconsin roads. Guth died at his home in Kewaskum, Wisconsin.

References

External links

1857 births
1939 deaths
People from Kewaskum, Wisconsin
Northwestern University alumni
Businesspeople from Wisconsin
Mayors of places in Wisconsin
People from Polk, Wisconsin
Republican Party members of the Wisconsin State Assembly